Der Bärenhäuter is an East German movie from the year 1986, based on the fairy tale Bearskin.

Plot 
The war has ended and soldier Christoffel no future and no money. He does not know what to do, because he meets the devil. He offers him a deal: Christoffel has cut the pockets always full of money, but he can not wash themselves for seven years, not the hair and nails and he can sleep in a bed. If he does not comply with all of these things, he will be devoted forever to the devil.

Christoffel accepts the condition.

The future worries rid themselves Christoffel makes his way. Soon, however, it is lonely. The company shuns him, and he's dirty, unkempt and smell. He finds only a place to stay in prison.

He paid the debt of a goldsmith, he thereby wins the heart of Catherine, the daughter of a goldsmith. Christoffel do know about its appearance and leaves her.

After seven years, finally he can wash away the devil himself and returns as a cultivated man back to her.

External links 
 

1986 films
1980s children's fantasy films
German children's fantasy films
East German films
Films based on Grimms' Fairy Tales

Films_based_on_fairy_tales
1980s German films